Florian Schönbeck (born 13 January 1974 in Munich, Bayern) is a retired German decathlete. His personal best result was 8127 points, achieved in September 2000 in Wesel. He was affiliated with the Leichtathletik Gemeinschaft Domspitzmilch Regensburg.

He competed in the decathlon at the 2004 Summer Olympics in Athens.

Achievements

References

External links

1974 births
Living people
German decathletes
Athletes (track and field) at the 2004 Summer Olympics
Olympic athletes of Germany
Sportspeople from Munich